Nordic Prize could refer to:

Swedish Academy's Nordic Prize
Nordic Council's Literature Prize
Nordic Council Music Prize 
Nordic Music Prize
Nordic Council Film Prize 
Nordic Fernström Prize
Philips Nordic Prize